Pycard, also spelt Picard and Picart (late 14th century – early 15th century) was an English or French Medieval and Renaissance transitional composer.

He may have served in John of Gaunt's household in the 1390s as 'Jehan Pycard alias Vaux'. The name "Picard" suggests a French origin, but his music is regarded as being in an English tradition. He is one of the most prolific composers represented in the Old Hall Manuscript (British Library: Additional 57950), with nine works from it attributed to him. His music is in the ars nova style, and is unusual in its virtuosity.

A mass by Pycard in the Old Hall Manuscript illustrates the sophistication of his isorhythmic techniques. Each quarter note in the lower part equals 4½ quarter notes in the upper parts, creating an uneven ratio of 4:9 that causes the parts to lose synchronization. The lower part then steadily contracts in a series of Pythagorean proportions (12:9:8:6) until the parts come back into alignment.

References

External links
"Pycard", HOASM.org ("Here of a Sunday Morning") WBAI
"The Works of Picard", La Trobe University Medieval Music Database

French composers
French male composers
English composers
14th-century births
15th-century deaths